James Bedford (1893–1967) was an American psychology professor.

James Bedford or Jimmy Bedford may also refer to:

Jimmy Bedford (1940–2009), American distiller
Jimmy B. Bedford (1927–1990), American journalist

See also
James Benford, American physicist